Cape Ross is a granite headland 8 nautical miles (15 km) north of Cape Archer on the coast of Victoria Land. First charted by the British Antarctic Expedition (1907–09) which named this feature for Sir James Clark Ross, the discoverer of the Ross Sea and Victoria Land.
 

Headlands of Victoria Land
Scott Coast